The following outline of evidence law in the United States sets forth the areas of contention that generally arise in the presentation of evidence in trial proceedings.

Relevance
Relevance
Public policy doctrines for the exclusion of relevant evidence
Burden of proof

Types of evidence
Testimony
Laying a foundation
Eyewitness identification
Character evidence
Habit evidence
Similar fact evidence
Documentary evidence
Authentication
Best evidence rule
Self-authenticating documents
Ancient documents
Parol evidence rule
Physical evidence
Chain of custody
Real evidence
Digital evidence
Exculpatory evidence
Scientific evidence
Genetic (DNA)
Demonstrative evidence
Lies

Judicial notice
Judicial notice

Witnesses
Witnesses
Competence
Dead man statute
Direct examination
Cross-examination
Witness impeachment
Recorded recollection
Expert witnesses

Privileges
Privilege

Hearsay and exceptions
Hearsay in English law
Hearsay in United States law
Confessions
Business records exception
Excited utterance
Dying declaration
Party admission
Ancient documents
Declarations against interest
Present sense impression
Res gestae
Learned treatise
Implied assertion

See also 
 Outline of law

External links 

 Federal Rules of Evidence Online

 
Evidence law in the United States
Evidence law in the United States
Evidence law
United States procedural law